San Francisco Baykeeper is a nonprofit environmental advocacy organization that works to protect, preserve, and enhance the health of the ecosystems and communities that depend upon the San Francisco Bay. Since 1989, Baykeeper has stood guard over the waters of the San Francisco Bay-Delta Estuary and its watershed. These waters, in addition to their recreational value and biological productivity, also provide drinking water for more than 23 million people and serve as the cornerstone of California's economy. Beginning in the high reaches of the Sierra Nevada and Cascade Mountains, the Bay-Delta watershed encompasses the entire Bay Area and the Great Central Valley of California. This vast watershed includes virtually all of the state's remaining coastal wetlands and provides rare and fragile habitat for marine mammals, migrating birds, and California's few remaining endangered salmon runs.

Baykeeper was founded by Michael Herz on the principle that California's waterways are common property, owned by all who use and enjoy them. Baykeeper works to rehabilitate natural environments and promote new strategies and policies to protect the water quality of the Bay-Delta Estuary. 

Baykeeper currently operates local chapters for the San Francisco Bay and the Sacramento-San Joaquin River Delta. It was founded in 1989 as the fourth "waterkeeper" organization in the nation and the first on the West Coast of the United States.

External links
 San Francisco Baykeeper
 Baykeeper in the news
 Albeck-Ripka, Livia (August 30, 2022) "/ Toxic Red Tide Kills ‘Uncountable’ Numbers of Fish in the Bay Area" New York Times
 Handa, Robert (April 23, 2021). "/ Redwood City Salt Ponds Likely Safe From Development – at Least for Now" NBC Bay Area.
 Meadows, Robin (June 1, 2017). "Mothball Fleet Update: The Long Goodbye to Suisun Bay's Derelict Ships." Bay Area Monitor.
 Cuff, Denis.  (February 1, 2017). "State Sued over Sand Mining in the Bay."  East Bay Times.
 Loftus-Farren, Zoe. (October 11, 2016). "Can California Finally Ditch Single-Use Plastic Bags?" Earth Island Journal.
 Visser, Nick.  (June 28, 2016). "Oakland Votes to Ban Coal Shipments, Could End Export Plans."  Huffington Post.
 Curry, Arwen. (November 5, 2015.) "Mercury In San Francisco Bay." KQED Quest.
 (June 29, 2015). "Neighbor Wasting Water?  Here's How to Get them Conserving Without #DroughtShaming." CBS.
 Brown, Kristin. (February 13, 2015). "Google Camera Helps Capture Bay's Rising Sea Level." San Francisco Chronicle.
 Kamiya, Gary. (March 20, 2014). "History Written in Water." San Francisco Magazine.
 Prado, Mark. ((May 24, 2013). "Bay Area Beaches Get Top Marks for Water Quality Report in Spring and Summer." Marin Independent Journal.
 Fimrite, Peter. (September 19, 2011). "$44 Million settles Cosco Busan Oil Spill in San Francisco Bay." San Francisco Chronicle.
 Scott, Julia (May 24, 2011). "Baykeeper makes legal headway against West Bay Sanitary District." Mercury News. 
 Nelson, Gabriel. (February 23, 2010). "Supreme Court Denies 3 High-Profile Environmental Cases" keeping intact Clean Water Act Protections. New York Times. 
 Gemmet, Andrea (December 11, 2009). "West Bay Sanitary Sued Over Sewage Spills." The Almanac.
 

Environmental organizations based in the San Francisco Bay Area
Non-profit organizations based in San Francisco
Environment of the San Francisco Bay Area
San Francisco Bay